Raymond Alexander Kerr (born September 10, 1994) is an American professional baseball pitcher for the San Diego Padres of Major League Baseball (MLB). He made his MLB debut in 2022.

Amateur career
Kerr graduated from Hug High School in Reno, Nevada, in 2013. He played college baseball for Mendocino College and Lassen College, and played collegiate summer baseball for the Peninsula Oilers in the Alaska Baseball League in 2017, where he reached  with his fastball.

Career

Seattle Mariners
Kerr signed with the Seattle Mariners of Major League Baseball as an undrafted free agent on August 24, 2017. He made his professional debut with the Single-A Clinton LumberKings in 2018, logging a 5–11 record and 4.28 ERA with 101 strikeouts across 25 starts. In 2019, Kerr split the season between the High-A Modesto Nuts and the Triple-A Tacoma Rainiers, posting a 4–7 record and 3.82 ERA with 95 strikeouts in 92.0 innings of work across 36 total appearances. Kerr did not play in a game in 2020 due to the cancellation of the minor league season because of the COVID-19 pandemic. He split the 2021 campaign between the Double-A Arkansas Travelers and Tacoma, pitching to a 3.18 ERA with 60 strikeouts in 36 appearances. The Mariners added him to their 40-man roster to protect him from the Rule 5 draft following the season on November 19, 2021.

San Diego Padres
On November 27, 2021, the Mariners traded Kerr and outfielder Corey Rosier to the San Diego Padres in exchange for Adam Frazier. He was assigned to the Triple-A El Paso Chihuahuas to begin the 2022 season.

On April 22, 2022, Kerr was promoted to major leagues for the first time to replace the injured Pierce Johnson. He made his major league debut on April 24.

References

External links

Living people
1994 births
Sportspeople from Sacramento, California
Baseball players from California
Major League Baseball pitchers
San Diego Padres players
Mendocino Eagles baseball players
Lassen Community College Cougars baseball players
Arizona League Mariners players
Clinton LumberKings players
Modesto Nuts players
Tacoma Rainiers players
Peoria Javelinas players
Arkansas Travelers players
El Paso Chihuahuas players
Peninsula Oilers players